Ruth Emily Prideaux (12 July 1930 – 7 April 2016) was an English former cricketer who played as a wicket-keeper. She appeared in 11 Test matches for England between 1957 and 1963. She was also England's first full-time head coach, and was in the role from 1988 to 1993, retiring after the side won the 1993 World Cup. She played domestic cricket for Yorkshire and Kent.

Personal life
Prideaux's husband, Roger, also played Test cricket for England. They were the first of only three married couples along with the Sri Lankans Guy de Alwis and Rasanjali Silva and the Australians Mitchell Starc and Alyssa Healy to have both played Test cricket.

References

External links
 
 

1930 births
2016 deaths
Cricketers from Kent
England women Test cricketers
English cricket coaches
Kent women cricketers
People from Greenhithe
Place of death missing
Yorkshire women cricketers